Hélène Rioux (born January 12, 1949) is a French Canadian writer and translator.

She was born in Montreal, Quebec and was educated at the Cégep du Vieux-Montréal, going on to study Russian at the Université de Montréal. Her stories have been published in various periodicals such as XYZ, Moebius, Arcade and Possibles. Rioux has also written a literary column for the Journal d'Outremont.

She has translated works by a number of Canadian authors into French, including works by Linda Leith, Julie Keith, Wayson Choy, Madeleine Thien, Taras Grescoe, Bernice Morgan and Lucy Maud Montgomery. Rioux received a Quebec Writers' Federation Award for her translation of Self by Yann Martel. She was also a finalist for the same award for her translation of The Memory Artists by Jeffrey Moore (Les artistes de la Mémoire). Her novels have been translated into English, Spanish and Bulgarian.

Selected works 
 Les Miroirs d'Éléonore, novel (1990), finalist for the Governor General's Award for French-language fiction and for the Grand Prix littéraire from the Journal de Montréal
 Chambre avec baignoire, novel (1992), won the Grand Prix littéraire from the Journal de Montréal and the Prix de la 
 Pense à mon rendez-vous (1994)

References 

1949 births
Living people
Canadian novelists in French
Canadian women novelists
20th-century Canadian novelists
20th-century Canadian translators
20th-century Canadian women writers
21st-century Canadian novelists
21st-century Canadian translators
21st-century Canadian women writers
Writers from Montreal
Université de Montréal alumni
Canadian women non-fiction writers